Reginald Walter Dann (6 June 1916 – 1948) was an English professional footballer. A  left-half, he was on the books of Blackpool, Gillingham, Tottenham Hotspur and Bradford Park Avenue.

References

1916 births
1948 deaths
Sportspeople from Maidstone
English footballers
Blackpool F.C. players
K Sports F.C. players
Gillingham F.C. players
Tottenham Hotspur F.C. players
Bradford (Park Avenue) A.F.C. players
Association football defenders